María Fernanda Landa (born 29 July 1975) is a former professional tennis player from Argentina.

Biography
Landa competed on the WTA Tour from 1995 and made all of her main-draw appearances in the doubles format, in which she reached 108 in the world. As a singles player she won six ITF titles, with a best ranking of 183.

She qualified for the main draw of the women's doubles at the 1996 US Open with Marlene Weingärtner and with the same partner was runner-up at the 1999 WTA Madrid Open.

At the 1999 Wimbledon Championships, Landa and Weingärtner received direct entry and were beaten in the first round by eventual champions Lindsay Davenport and Corina Morariu. She also competed in the mixed-doubles draw at Wimbledon that year with Diego del Río.

She now runs a tennis school in Tigre, Buenos Aires.

WTA career finals

Doubles: 1 (1 title)

ITF Circuit finals

Singles: 15 (6–9)

Doubles: 27 (14–13)

References

External links
 
 

1975 births
Living people
Argentine female tennis players
20th-century Argentine women